Wiru or Witu is the language spoken by the Wiru people of Ialibu-Pangia District of the Southern Highlands Province of Papua New Guinea. The language has been described by Harland Kerr, a missionary who lived in the Wiru community for many years. Kerr's work with the community produced a Wiru Bible translation and several unpublished dictionary manuscripts, as well as Kerr's Master's thesis on the structure of Wiru verbs.

There are a considerable number of resemblances with the Engan languages, suggesting Wiru might be a member of that family, but language contact has not been ruled out as the reason. Usher classifies it with the Teberan languages.

Pronouns
Trans–New Guinea–like pronouns are no 1sg (< *na) and ki-wi 2pl, ki-ta 2du (< *ki).

Vocabulary
The following basic vocabulary words are from Franklin (1973, 1975), as cited in the Trans-New Guinea database:

Syntax
Wiru has a general noun-modifying clause construction. In this construction, a noun can be modified by a clause that immediately precedes it. The noun may, but need not, correspond to an argument of the modifying clause. Such constructions can be used to express a wide range of semantic relationships between clause and noun. The follow examples all use the same noun-modifying clause construction:

The noun-modifying clause construction imposes a falling tone on the head noun. That is, no matter what the lexical tone of the noun that is being modified is, it takes on a high-low tone pattern when it is modified in a noun-modifying clause construction.

Evolution
Wiru reflexes of proto-Trans-New Guinea (pTNG) etyma are:

ibi(ni) ‘name’ < *imbi
nomo ‘louse’ < *niman
laga ‘ashes’ < *la(ŋg,k)a
tokene ‘moon’ < *takVn[V]
mane ‘instructions, incantations’ < *mana
keda ‘heavy’ < *ke(nd,n)a
mo- ‘negative prefix’ < *ma-

References

Further reading
"Outside and Inside Meanings: Non-Verbal and Verbal Modalities of Agonistic Communication the Wiru of Papua New Guinea" in Man and Culture in Oceania, Vol. 15

External links 
 Timothy Usher, New Guinea World, Witu
 Andrew Strathern and Pamela J. Stewart Recordings -  Andrew Strathern and Pamela J. Stewart Recordings From the Andrew Strathern and Pamela J. Stewart Photographs and Audiorecordings. MSS 477. Special Collections & Archives, UC San Diego.

Teberan–Pawaian languages
Languages of Southern Highlands Province